The Bourne Baronetcy, of Hackinsall Hall in the parish of Stalmine, and of Heathfield in the parish of Childwell, both in the County Palatine of Lancaster, was a title in the Baronetage of the United Kingdom. It was created on 10 May 1880 for the Conservative Party politician James Bourne. The title became extinct on the death of his son, the second Baronet, in 1883.

Bourne baronets, of Hackinsall Hall and Heathfield (1880)
Sir James Bourne, 1st Baronet (1812–1882)
Sir James Dyson Bourne, 2nd Baronet (1842–1883)

References

Extinct baronetcies in the Baronetage of the United Kingdom